Anthony Griffith may refer to 

Anthony Griffith (actor), an American actor and comedian
Anthony Griffith (footballer), an English-born footballer for Montserrat

See also
Antony Griffiths, an English art historian and curator of prints